89/93: An Anthology is a retrospective compilation album by American alternative country band Uncle Tupelo, released in 2002 by Legacy Recordings.

The compilation contains mostly original songs from Uncle Tupelo's four studio albums. "Outdone" is a demo version of the song released on No Depression. "I Wanna Be Your Dog" was previously unreleased. "Looking for a Way Out" is an acoustic version of the track released on Still Feel Gone. "Effigy", a Creedence Clearwater Revival cover, was originally released on the 1993 compilation album No Alternative.

Track listing
"No Depression" – (A.P. Carter)
"Screen Door" – (Farrar, Tweedy, Heidorn)
"Graveyard Shift" – (Farrar, Tweedy, Heidorn)
"Whiskey Bottle" – (Farrar, Tweedy, Heidorn)
"Outdone" (1989 Demo)* – (Farrar, Tweedy, Heidorn)
"I Got Drunk" – (Farrar, Tweedy, Heidorn)
"I Wanna Be Your Dog"*– (The Stooges)
"Gun" – (Farrar, Tweedy, Heidorn)
"Still Be Around" – (Farrar, Tweedy, Heidorn)
"Looking for a Way Out" (Acoustic Version)* – (Farrar, Tweedy, Heidorn)
"Watch Me Fall" – (Farrar, Tweedy, Heidorn)
"Sauget Wind" – (Farrar, Tweedy, Heidorn)
"Black Eye" – (Farrar, Tweedy)
"Moonshiner" – (traditional, arranged by Farrar, Tweedy)
"Fatal Wound" – (Farrar, Tweedy)
"Grindstone" – (Farrar, Tweedy)
"Effigy" – (Fogerty)
"The Long Cut" – (Farrar, Tweedy)
"Chickamauga" – (Farrar, Tweedy)
"New Madrid" – (Farrar, Tweedy)
"We've Been Had" (Live) – (Farrar, Tweedy)

*Previously Unreleased

References

Uncle Tupelo albums
2002 compilation albums
Legacy Recordings compilation albums
Albums produced by Jeff Tweedy
Albums produced by Jay Farrar